Lucy Tui Hampton Aitken  ( Flower, 23 November 1925 – 15 August 2017), generally known as Tui Flower, was a pioneering New Zealand food writer. She has been described as "New Zealand's Julia Child".

Early life and family
Born in Matamata on 23 November 1925, Flower was the daughter of Leonard Flower, a postmaster, and Constance Ruby Irene Flower (née Mincher). She grew up in Matamata and Tauranga, and received her secondary education at Epsom Girls' Grammar School, where she was a boarder. In 1944, she went on to study at the University of Otago, obtaining a Diploma of Home Science.

Career
After leaving Otago, Flower taught home science at Pukekohe High School. In 1951, she travelled to the United States, where she attended a number of Cordon Bleu courses. She was awarded a bursary to study at the École hôtelière de Paris in 1954–55, and was subsequently employed by Unilever in Wellington as a home economist. In her nine years at Unilever she worked initially on laundry and cleaning products and packaging, and later on frozen, dehydrated and canned foods.

Visits to family in the United States exposed Flower to food journalism, and in 1965 she was appointed as the food editor of the New Zealand Woman's Weekly. She established New Zealand's first magazine-based test kitchen, using her scientific background for recipe testing and adapting traditional recipes for modern equipment and busy lives. Likened to the American food writer Julia Child, Flower is credited with helping New Zealanders move away from their traditional meat, potato and vegetable dinner, and was among those who popularised ingredients perceived as exotic, such as garlic, capsicum and avocado. When Flower retired from her role at the New Zealand Woman's Weekly, her test kitchen had a staff of nine.

In addition to her regular food editorial column and recipes in the Woman's Weekly, Flower contributed to the Auckland Star and the New Zealand Home Journal, and wrote or edited a number of cookbooks. In 1982, she established the Star–Woman's Weekly School of Cooking. Flower was instrumental in the formation of the New Zealand Guild of Food Writers in 1988, and served as its inaugural chair.

Personal life
In 1980, Flower married Keith Thomas Aitken, who was editor of the Auckland Star newspaper from 1977 until his retirement in 1983. He died in February 1985.

Honours
In the 1983 New Year Honours, Flower was awarded the Queen's Service Medal for public services. She was also a life member of the New Zealand Guild of Food Writers.

Later life and death
In her retirement, Flower lived in the Auckland suburb of Mount Eden, in a house that had been owned by her maternal grandparents. She continued to write and edit cookbooks, and mentored many New Zealand food writers. In 1998 she published her autobiography, Self-raising Flower. She was still involved in the food industry in 2016, when she worked with Eggs Incorporated to promote World Egg Day.

Flower died in Auckland on 15 August 2017.

Selected publications

References

1925 births
2017 deaths
People from Matamata
People educated at Epsom Girls' Grammar School
University of Otago alumni
New Zealand schoolteachers
New Zealand food writers
New Zealand women writers
Recipients of the Queen's Service Medal